"12:51" is a song by American rock band the Strokes. It was released on October 6, 2003, as the first single from their second studio album, Room on Fire (2003). The track was written by Julian Casablancas and produced by Gordon Raphael. It peaked at number 7 on the UK Singles Chart.

Critical reception
"12:51" received positive reviews from critics. Billboard'''s Wes Orshoski wrote of the song: "Julian Casablancas' sleepy vocals arrive in synch with a nerdy, very '80s keyboard [Nick Valensi's guitar] that sounds so much cooler than it probably should against guitarists Nick Valensi and Albert Hammond Jr.'s raw, fast strumming, the throbbing bass of Nikolai Fraiture and drummer Fabrizio Moretti's cool swing beat." AllMusic's Heather Phares wrote that "its whistling, synth-like guitars and handclaps are undeniably catchy, but at first, the song seems to be searching for a structure. Eventually, though, it becomes sneakily addictive -- it's a stealth pop song."

The song peaked at number 15 on the Billboard Alternative Songs chart.

Music video
The music video for "12:51" was directed by Roman Coppola and was inspired by the 1982 film Tron''.

Track listing

Charts

References

External links

2003 songs
2003 singles
American new wave songs
The Strokes songs
Songs written by Julian Casablancas
RCA Records singles
Rough Trade Records singles
Music videos directed by Roman Coppola